Limata was a Roman era city of Byzacena, in Roman North Africa. 
It was home to the Bishop, Purpurius, one of the founders of Donatist Movement.

References

Roman towns and cities in Tunisia